Everen Limited is a Bermuda–based mutual insurance company. It was founded in 1972 by 16 oil companies.

Founding shareholders 

The founding shareholders were:

 Amerada Hess Corporation
 Ashland Oil & Refining
 Atlantic Richfield Company
 Champlin Petroleum Company
 Cities Service Company
 Forest Oil Company
 Gulf Oil Corporation
 Marathon Oil Company
 Murphy Oil Corporation
 Petrofina S.A.
 Phillips Petroleum Company
 Signal Oil and Gas Company
 Standard Oil Company of California
 Tenneco Inc.
 The Standard Oil Company (Ohio)
 Union Oil Company of California

See also 
 Nuclear Electric Insurance Limited—mutual insurance company serving the nuclear power industry

References

External links 
 

Insurance companies of Bermuda
Mutual insurance companies
Petroleum industry
Financial services companies established in 1972